"Yeah Yeah Yeah" was a 1951 song by Louis Prima written by Prima with Milton Kabak which was covered by Paul Gayten, Joe Morris, a single by Peggy Lee and Jerry Gray and His Orchestra, all in 1951.

References

1951 songs
Songs written by Louis Prima